Rollingen is a town in the commune of Mersch, in central Luxembourg.  , the town has a population of 1,200. The painter Corneille Lentz was born here. Moreover, Rollingen is the hometown of the pro-cyclist Bob Jungels.

References

Mersch
Towns in Luxembourg